The  is a concert hall in Taitō, Tokyo, Japan.

Old Hall
Established in 1890, it is the oldest western-style concert hall in Japan. Formerly the hall belonged to the Tokyo Music School, now the Tokyo University of the Arts. By 1972, it had become too old for school use, so Taitō Ward obtained the property, now designated an Important Cultural Property. The hall was rebuilt in Ueno Park, and nearby stands the statue of Rentarō Taki, one of its alumni.

New Hall
The new Sōgakudō Concert Hall opened on the university campus in April 1998. The structure, by Okada Architect & Associates with acoustical design by Nagata Acoustics, is insulated from the vibrations of the subway below by rubber springs.

Access
        Ueno Station (with JR East and Tokyo Metro)
   Uguisudani Station (with JR East)
  Keisei Ueno Station (with Keisei Electric Railway)

References

External links
 New Hall 
 Old Hall 

Ueno Park
Music venues in Tokyo
Concert halls in Japan
Buildings and structures in Taitō